Sky Liner is a 1949 American film noir action crime film directed by William Berke. It was released on the bottom half of double bills.

Plot
The film follows a selection of passengers on a long distance overnight flight on a silver Lockheed Constellation with Trans World Airlines.

The film comprises a series of vignettes looking at the passengers and crew. Characters range from a precocious child star (intended to echo Shirley Temple) to businessmen and criminals.

An FBI man (Richard Travis) and a stewardess (Pamela Blake) solve a spy murder on a crowded airliner.

A dead man is found in the toilet. All passengers are suspects. The plane sets down at Jacksonfield while they investigate. They discover he has been stabbed by a fountain pen containing poisoned ink.

Cast
 Richard Travis as Steve Blair
 Pamela Blake as Carol
 Rochelle Hudson as Amy Winthrop
 Steven Geray as Bokejian
 Gaylord Pendleton as Smith
 Ralph Peters as Joe Kirk
 Michael Whalen as Ben Howard
 Greg McClure as J. S. Conningsby
 Lisa Ferraday as Mariette La Fare
 Roy Butler as Mr. Jennings
 Jean Clark as Mrs. Jennings
 David Holt as Buford
 Dodie Holt as Grace Ward
 William F. Leicester as Captain Fairchild – Pilot (as Wm. Leicester)
 Ezelle Poule as Elvin's Sister
 Herbert Evans as Sir Harry Finneston
 Alice Ritchie as Elvia's
 Jeanne Sorel as Brunet Stewardess (as Jean Sorel)
 Anne Lu Jones as Airline Ticket Agent 
 Jack Mulhall as Col. Hanson
 Allan Hersholt as Courier (as Alan Hersholt)
 John McGuire as George Eakins
 George Meeker as Financier
 Anna Mae Slaughter as Mary Ann

Production
Filming started 25 April 1949 at Hal Roach's studios. It was described as "a kind of Grand Hotel of an airliner."

It was made by the same writing-directing-producing team that had done Highway 13.

References

External links

1949 films
American crime thriller films
1940s English-language films
Films directed by William A. Berke
Lippert Pictures films
Films scored by Raoul Kraushaar
1940s crime thriller films
American black-and-white films
1940s American films